Count , also known as , was a Japanese politician of the Meiji era. He was Prime Minister of Japan from 1888 to 1889. He was also vice chairman of the Hokkaido Development Commission (Kaitaku-shi).

Biography

As a Satsuma samurai 

Kuroda was born to a samurai-class family serving the Shimazu daimyō of Kagoshima, Satsuma Domain, in Kyūshū.

In 1862, Kuroda was involved in the Namamugi incident, in which Satsuma retainers killed a British national who refused to bow down to the daimyo's procession.  This led to the Anglo-Satsuma War in 1863, in which Kuroda played an active role.  Immediately after the war, he went to Edo where he studied gunnery.

Returning to Satsuma, Kuroda became an active member of the Satsuma-Chōshū joint effort to overthrow the Tokugawa shogunate.  Later, as a military leader in the Boshin War, he became famous for sparing the life of Enomoto Takeaki, who had stood against Kuroda's army at the Battle of Hakodate.

Political and diplomatic career 

Under the new Meiji government, Kuroda became a pioneer-diplomat to Karafuto, claimed by both Japan and the Russian Empire in 1870. Terrified of Russia's push eastward, Kuroda returned to Tokyo and advocated quick development and settlement of Japan's northern frontier.  In 1871 he traveled to Europe and the United States for five months, and upon returning to Japan in 1872, he was put in charge of colonization efforts in Hokkaidō.

In 1874, Kuroda was named director of the Hokkaidō Colonization Office, and organized a colonist-militia scheme to settle the island with unemployed ex-samurai and retired soldiers who would serve as both farmers and as a local militia. He was also promoted to lieutenant general in the Imperial Japanese Army. Kuroda invited agricultural experts from overseas countries with a similar climate to visit Hokkaidō, and to provide advice on what crops and production methods might be successful.

Kuroda was dispatched as an envoy to Korea in 1875, and negotiated the Japan–Korea Treaty of 1876. In 1877, he was sent as part of the force to suppress the Satsuma Rebellion. In 1878, he became de facto leader of Satsuma Domain following the assassination of Ōkubo Toshimichi.

Shortly before he left office in Hokkaidō, Kuroda became the central figure in the Hokkaidō Colonization Office Scandal of 1881. As part of the government's privatization program, Kuroda attempted to sell the assets of the Hokkaidō Colonization Office to a trading consortium created by some of his former Satsuma colleagues for a nominal price. When the terms of the sale were leaked to the press, the resultant public outrage caused the sale to fall through. Also in 1881, Kuroda's wife died of a lung disease, but on rumors that Kuroda had killed her in a drunken rage, the body was exhumed and examined. Kuroda was cleared of charges, but rumors of his problems with alcohol abuse persisted.

In 1887, Kuroda was appointed to the cabinet post of Minister of Agriculture and Commerce.

Prime minister 
Kuroda Kiyotaka became the 2nd Prime Minister of Japan, after Itō Hirobumi in 1888. During his term, he oversaw the promulgation of the Meiji Constitution. However, the vexing issue of Japan's inability to secure revision of the unequal treaties created considerable controversy. After drafts of proposed revisions drawn up his foreign minister Ōkuma Shigenobu became public in 1889, Kuroda was forced to resign.

Later life 
Kuroda served as Minister of Communications in 1892 under the 2nd Ito Cabinet. In 1895 he became a genrō, and chairman of the Privy Council.  Kuroda died of a brain hemorrhage in 1900 and Enomoto Takeaki presided over his funeral ceremonies. His grave is at the Aoyama Cemetery in Tokyo.

Honours 
From the corresponding Japanese Wikipedia article
Grand Cordon of the Order of the Rising Sun (2 November 1877)
Count (7 July 1884)
Grand Cordon of the Order of the Rising Sun with Paulownia Flowers (20 August 1895)
Grand Cordon of the Order of the Chrysanthemum (25 August 1900; posthumous)

See also 

 List of Ambassadors from Japan to South Korea

References

Further reading 
 Auslin, Michael R. (2006). Negotiating with Imperialism: The Unequal Treaties and the Culture of Japanese Diplomacy. Cambridge: Harvard University Press. ; OCLC 56493769
 Jansen, Marius B. (2000). The Making of Modern Japan. Cambridge: Harvard University Press. ; OCLC 44090600
 Keene, Donald. (2002). Emperor of Japan: Meiji and His World, 1852–1912. New York: Columbia University Press. ; OCLC 46731178
 Nussbaum, Louis-Frédéric and Käthe Roth. (2005).  Japan encyclopedia. Cambridge: Harvard University Press. ; OCLC 58053128
 Sims, Richard L. (2001). Japanese Political History Since the Meiji Renovation 1868–2000. New York: Palgrave Macmillan. ; ; OCLC 45172740

External links 

|-

|-

|-

|-

1840 births
1900 deaths
19th-century prime ministers of Japan
Government ministers of Japan
Japanese generals
Kazoku
Boshin War
Meiji Restoration
People from Kagoshima
People from Satsuma Domain
People of Meiji-period Japan
People of the Boshin War
Prime Ministers of Japan
Samurai
Shimazu retainers